Big Seven Conference may refer to:

 Big Eight Conference, an unofficial name used in the 1948–1957 era
 Skyline Conference (1938–1962) (officially the Mountain States Athletic Conference and also known informally as the Mountain States Conference), an unofficial name used in the 1938–1947 era